Trichoanoreina albomaculata is a species of beetle in the family Cerambycidae, and the only species in the genus Trichoanoreina. It was described by Julio and Monne in 2005.

References

Acanthoderini
Beetles described in 2005
Monotypic beetle genera